The year 1900 in art involved some significant events and new works.

Events
 April 14–November 12 – Exposition Universelle in Paris helps popularize Art Nouveau style. Alphonse Mucha decorates the Bosnia and Herzegovina Pavilion and collaborates on the Austria-Hungary one.
 F. Holland Day organizes an exhibition of the New School of American Photography at the Royal Photographic Society in London.
 The Wallace Collection in London opens to the public.
 The Zachęta art gallery in Warsaw is completed.
 Claude Monet stays in London and begins his Houses of Parliament series of paintings.
 Wilhelm von Debschitz and Hermann Obrist found the Lehr- und Versuchsatelier für angewandte und freikunst, an influential art school in Munich.

Works

 Mary Cassatt
 Jules Being Dried by His Mother
 Young Mother Sewing
 Frank Cadogan Cowper – Rapunzel
 Aurélia de Souza – Self-portrait
 Maurice de Vlaminck
 Sur le zinc ("At the Bar")
 L'homme a la pipe ("Man Smoking a Pipe")
 Adolphe Demange
 La Duchesse d'Uzès travaillant à la statue monumentale de Jeanne d'Arc, dans l'atelier de Falguière
 Place de la Concorde
 Maurice Denis – Homage to Cézanne
 Frank Dicksee – The Two Crowns
 Thomas Eakins
 Portrait of Mary Adeline Williams (second version, Philadelphia Museum of Art)
 The Thinker: Portrait of Louis N. Kenton (Metropolitan Museum of Art, New York)
 Florence Fuller – Inseparables
 J. W. Godward
 Idleness
 The Jewel Casket
 The Toilet
 Vilhelm Hammershøi – Sunbeams
 Holman Hunt – The Light of the World (replica)
 Paja Jovanović – The Proclamation of Dušan's Law Codex
 Henry Herbert La Thangue – The Watersplash
 Edmund Leighton – God Speed
 Maximilien Luce – Notre Dame de Paris
 Ambrose McEvoy – Bessborough Street, Pimlico (Tate)
 Henri Matisse
 Notre-Dame (Tate)
 Two self-portraits
 Edvard Munch
 Golgotha
 Red Virginia Creeper
 Emil Nolde – Wheat Field (approximate dat)
 William Orpen – Herbert Everett (National Maritime Museum, Greenwich)
 Roland Hinton Perry – Thompson Elk Fountain (bronze, Portland, Oregon)
 Pablo Picasso
 Le Blouse Romaine
 Le Moulin de la Galette
 Fritz von Uhde – Woman, why weepest thou?
 J. W. Waterhouse
 Destiny
 The Siren

Births
 January 5 – Yves Tanguy, French surrealist painter (d. 1955)
 January 8 – Serge Poliakoff, Russian-born painter (d. 1969)
 January 10 – Harry Kernoff, Irish painter (d. 1974)
 January 28 – Alice Neel, American portrait painter (d.1984)
 January 31 – Betty Parsons, American painter and gallerist (d. 1982)
 March 1 – Nano Reid, Irish painter (d. 1981)
 March 10 – Corrado Parducci, Italian-American architectural sculptor (d. 1981)
 April 13 – Pierre Molinier, French painter and photographer (d. 1976)
 April 20 – Jacques Adnet, French modernist designer, architect and interior designer (d. 1984)
 June 13 – Pierre Matisse, French-born gallerist, son of Henri Matisse (d. 1989)
 June 22 – Oskar Fischinger, German-American abstract animator, filmmaker and painter (d. 1967)
 July 19 – Arno Breker, German sculptor (d. 1991)
 August 12 – Ronald Moody, Jamaican-born woodcarver (d. 1984)
 August 15 – Jack Tworkov, American abstract expressionist painter (d. 1982)
 August 23 – Louise Nevelson, Ukrainian-born American artist (d. 1988)
 September 19 – Ong Schan Tchow, Chinese artist (d. 1945)
 October 1 – Živko Stojsavljević, Serbian painter (d. 1978)
 October 14 – Roland Penrose, English surrealist painter and art collector (d. 1984)
 October 16
 Edward Ardizzone, British writer and illustrator (d. 1979)
 Primo Conti, Italian Futurist artist (d. 1988)
 October 17 – C. C. van Asch van Wijck, Dutch artist and sculptor (d. 1932)
 November 20 – Chester Gould, American cartoonist (d. 1985)
 date unknown
 Francesco Di Cocco, Italian painter (d. 1989)
 Guan Liang, Chinese painter (d. 1986)
 Grace Morley, American curator (d. 1985)
 Fannie Nampeyo, American Hopi potter and ceramic artist (d. 1987)
 Tanasko Milovich, Serbian painter (d. 1964)

Deaths
 January 20 – John Ruskin, English art critic (b. 1819)
 April 7 – Frederic Edwin Church, American landscape painter (b. 1826)
 April 15 – Jules Dalou, French sculptor (b. 1838)
 April 20 – Alexandre Falguière, French painter and sculptor (b. 1831)
 May 5 – Ivan Aivazovsky, Russian seascape painter (b. 1817)
 June 11 – Otto Eckmann, German painter and graphic artist (b. 1865)
 July 2 – Thomas Farrell, Irish sculptor (b. 1827)
 July 28 – Jehan Georges Vibert, French academic painter (b. 1840)
 August 4 – Isaac Levitan, Russian landscape painter (b. 1860)
 August 17 – Thomas Faed, Scottish genre painter (b. 1826)
 October 27 – William Anderson, English collector of Japanese art (b. 1842)
 November 29 – Méry Laurent, French muse and model to Édouard Manet  (b. 1849)

References

 
Years of the 19th century in art
1900s in art